Serbia originally planned to participate in the Eurovision Song Contest 2020 with the song "" written by Nemanja Antonić, Kosana Stojić and Sanja Vučić. The song was performed by the group Hurricane, which among its members included Sanja Vučić who had previously represented Serbia in the Eurovision Song Contest in 2016 where she placed eighteenth with the song "Goodbye (Shelter)". The Serbian national broadcaster, Radio Television of Serbia (RTS) organised the national final  in order to select the Serbian entry for the 2020 contest in Rotterdam, Netherlands. The national final consisted of three shows: two semi-finals on 28 and 29 February 2020 and a final on 1 March 2020. Twelve entries competed in each semi-final where the top six qualified to the final from each semi-final following the combination of votes from a five-member jury panel and a public televote. The twelve qualifiers competed in the final which resulted in "" performed by Hurricane as the winner following the combination of votes from a five-member jury panel and a public televote.

Serbia was drawn to compete in the second semi-final of the Eurovision Song Contest which would have taken place on 14 May 2020. However, the contest was cancelled due to the COVID-19 pandemic.

Background 

Prior to the 2020 Contest, Serbia had participated in the Eurovision Song Contest twelve times since its first entry in 2007, winning the contest with their debut entry "" performed by Marija Šerifović. Since 2007, nine out of twelve of Serbia's entries have featured in the final with the nation failing to qualify in 2009, 2013 and 2017. Serbia's 2019 entry "" performed by Nevena Božović qualified to the final and placed eighteenth.

The Serbian national broadcaster, Radio Television of Serbia (RTS), broadcasts the event within Serbia and organises the selection process for the nation's entry. RTS confirmed their intentions to participate at the 2020 Eurovision Song Contest on 25 July 2019. Between 2007 and 2009, Serbia used the  national final in order to select their entry. However, after their 2009 entry, "" performed by Marko Kon and Milaan, failed to qualify Serbia to the final, the broadcaster shifted their selection strategy to selecting specific composers to create songs for artists. In 2010, RTS selected Goran Bregović to compose songs for a national final featuring three artists, while in 2011 Kornelije Kovač, Aleksandra Kovač and Kristina Kovač were tasked with composing one song each. In 2012, the internal selection of Željko Joksimović and the song "" secured the country's second highest placing in the contest to this point, placing third. In 2013, RTS returned to an open national final format and organized the Beosong competition. The winning entry, "" performed by Moje 3, failed to qualify Serbia to the final at the 2013 Eurovision Song Contest. In 2015, RTS selected Vladimir Graić, the composer of Serbia's 2007 Eurovision Song Contest winning entry "", to compose songs for a national final featuring three artists. RTS internally selected the Serbian entries in 2016 and 2017 with the decision made by RTS music editors. In 2018 and 2019, RTS returned to using the  national final in order to select their entry, managing to qualify every year to the final since.

Before Eurovision

Beovizija 2020
 was the tenth edition of the  national final organised by RTS in order to select the Serbian entry for the Eurovision Song Contest 2020. The competition simultaneously celebrated the 30th anniversary of the Eurovision Song Contest 1990, the only hosting of the Eurovision Song Contest by the former Yugoslav Radio Television. The selection consisted of two semi-finals featuring twelve songs each to be held on 28 and 29 February 2020, respectively, and a final featuring twelve songs to be held on 1 March 2020. The three shows were broadcast on RTS1 and RTS Planeta as well as streamed online via the broadcaster's website rts.rs.

Competing entries 

Artists and songwriters were able to submit their entries between 20 August 2019 and 9 December 2019. Artists were required to be Serb citizens and submit entries in one of the official languages of the Republic of Serbia, while songwriters of any nationality were allowed to submit songs. At the closing of the deadline, 90 submissions were received. A selection committee consisting of RTS music editors reviewed the submissions and selected twenty-four entries to proceed to the national final. The selected competing entries were announced on 9 January 2020 and among the competing artists was Sanja Vučić (as part of the group Hurricane) who represented Serbia in the Eurovision Song Contest 2016.

Semi-finals
Two semi-finals took place at the Studio 8 of RTS in Košutnjak, Belgrade on 28 and 29 February 2020. In each semi-final twelve songs competed and six qualifiers for the final were decided by a combination of votes from a jury panel consisting of Aleksandar Ristić (evrovizija.rs journalist), Natalija Milosavljević (Radio S music editor), Dragoslav Stanisavljević (musician), Ana Štajdohar (singer) and Dragoljub Ilić (composer), and the Serbian public via SMS voting.

In addition to the competing entries, other performanced featured during the shows. In semi-final 1, former Eurovision contestants Extra Nena, who represented Yugoslavia in 1992, Milan Stanković, who represented Serbia in 2010, Maya Sar, who represented Bosnia and Herzegovina in 2012, and Tijana Bogićević, who represented Serbia in 2017, were featured as guest performers during the show. In semi-final 2, former Eurovision contestants Bebi Dol, who represented Yugoslavia in 1991, Nevena Božović, who represented Serbia in 2013 as member of the group Moje 3 and in 2019, Tijana Dapčević, who represented Macedonia in 2014, and Sanja Ilić and Balkanika, which represented Serbia in 2018, were featured as guest performers during the show.

Final
The final took place at the Studio 8 of RTS in Košutnjak, Belgrade on 1 March 2020 and featured the twelve qualifiers from the preceding two semi-finals. The winner, "Hasta la vista" performed by Hurricane, was decided by a combination of votes from a jury panel consisting of Nevena Božović (represented Serbia in the Eurovision Song Contest 2013 as part of Moje 3 and in 2019), Aleksandra Milutinović (composer), Milan Đurđević (musician), Aleksandra Kovač (singer) and Dragan Brajović (composer), and the Serbian public via SMS voting. Former Eurovision contestants Hari Mata Hari, who represented Bosnia and Herzegovina in 2006, Marija Šerifović, who won the contest for Serbia in 2007, Mladen Lukić, which represented Serbia in 2018 as part of the group Balkanika, and singers Ivana Vladović and Olga Popović were featured as guest performers during the show.

OGAE awards

Following the event, the fan organisation OGAE Serbia voted on the best song at  2020 as decided by association members. The award was won by the winning song "" with 149 points. Second place, with 103 points, came from the song "" by Andrija Jo, while third place went to Thea Devy and her song "" with 84 points. Andrija Jo was also the winner of the OGAE Second Chance, which was awarded after a round of voting with all entries, not including the winning song of the event.

At Eurovision 
According to Eurovision rules, all nations with the exceptions of the host country and the "Big Five" (France, Germany, Italy, Spain and the United Kingdom) are required to qualify from one of two semi-finals in order to compete for the final; the top ten countries from each semi-final progress to the final. The European Broadcasting Union (EBU) split up the competing countries into six different pots based on voting patterns from previous contests, with countries with favourable voting histories put into the same pot. On 28 January 2020, a special allocation draw was held which placed each country into one of the two semi-finals, as well as which half of the show they would perform in. Serbia was placed into the second semi-final, to be held on 14 May 2020, and was scheduled to perform in the first half of the show. However, due to 2019-20 pandemic of Coronavirus, the contest was cancelled.

During the Eurovision Song Celebration YouTube broadcast in place of the semi-finals, it was revealed that Serbia was set to perform in position 7, following the entry from Czech Republic and before the entry from Poland. Whilst footage from the music video shoot was shown before the song was broadcast on Eurovision: Europe Shine a Light, the excerpt of the song aired was from the Beovizija performance.

Jelena Karleusa later performed "Hasta la vista" alongside the group during an online concert later in May 2020. An English language version of "Hasta la vista" was also subsequently released in May 2020.

References

External links
 

2020
Countries in the Eurovision Song Contest 2020
Eurovision